Margaret Rivers Tragett (née Larminie) was a former English badminton player. She competed in the All England Championships from 1902 until 1933 and was the winner of eleven titles. She gained fifteen caps for England and was also editor of the 'Gazette' a popular badminton publication.

After marrying Robert Tragett in 1911 she competed under her married name of Margaret Tragett.

Medal Record at the All England Badminton Championships

References

English female badminton players
1885 births
1964 deaths
Migrants from British Jamaica to the United Kingdom